Epsilon Cygni (ε Cygni, abbreviated Epsilon Cyg, ε Cyg) is multiple star system in the constellation of Cygnus. With an apparent visual magnitude of 2.48, it is readily visible to the naked eye at night as one of the brighter members of Cygnus.  Based upon parallax measurement, Epsilon Cygni is about 73 light-years from the Sun.

The system has three constituents: a spectroscopic binary (designated Epsilon Cygni A); an optical companion (B) and a single star (C). A's two components are themselves designated Epsilon Cygni Aa (officially named Aljanah ) and Ab.

Nomenclature 
ε Cygni (Latinised to Epsilon Cygni) is the system's Bayer designation. The designations of the three constituents as Epsilon Cygni A, B and C, and those of A's components - Epsilon Cygni Aa and Ab - derive from the convention used by the Washington Multiplicity Catalog (WMC) for multiple star systems, and adopted by the International Astronomical Union (IAU).

Epsilon Cygni bore the traditional name Gienah from the Arabic al janāħ meaning "the wing". However that name was more usually applied to Gamma Corvi. For reasons of disambiguation it was sometimes called Gienah Cygni. In 2016, the IAU organized a Working Group on Star Names (WGSN) to catalog and standardize proper names for stars. The WGSN decided to attribute proper names to individual stars rather than entire multiple systems. It approved the name Aljanah for the component Epsilon Cygni Aa on 30 June 2017. It had previously approved the name Gienah for Gamma Corvi A on 6 November 2016. Both are now so included in the List of IAU-approved Star Names.

In Chinese astronomy, the "Celestial Ford" refers to an asterism consisting of Epsilon Cygni, Gamma Cygni, Delta Cygni, 30 Cygni, Alpha Cygni, Nu Cygni, Tau Cygni, Upsilon Cygni and Zeta Cygni. Consequently, the Chinese name for Epsilon Cygni Cygni itself is "the Ninth Star of Celestial Ford".

Companions
Epsilon Cygni A has an optical companion, Epsilon Cygni B, with which it is not physically associated, and a 13th magnitude candidate common proper motion companion, Epsilon Cygni C, at an angular separation of 78 arcseconds. If the latter star is gravitationally bound to Epsilon Cygni A, then they are currently separated by 1700 AU or more, and have an orbital period of at least 50,000 years.

Properties 

Epsilon Cygni A is a single-lined spectroscopic binary. Radial velocity observations suggest a possible companion with an orbital period of at least 15 years. It presents as a giant star with a stellar classification of K0 III. This indicates that the star has left the main sequence and has begun the final stages in its stellar evolution. The effective temperature of its photosphere is 4,710 K, giving an orange hue that is a characteristic of K-type stars. It has nearly 11 times the solar radius and is about 62 times the luminosity of the Sun.

Since 1943, the spectrum of Epsilon Cygni A has served as one of the stable anchor points by which other stars are classified.

Veil Nebula

ε Cygni lies about three degrees north of the Veil nebula, a probable ancient supernova remnant.  The nebula is far more distant than the star.

References

External links
 http://www.pbase.com/mcrowle/image/81902791

Cygni, Epsilon
Cygnus (constellation)
K-type giants
Aljanah
Cygni, 53
7949
197989
102488
BD+33 4018
0806.1
Multiple stars